Tammiku is a small borough in Jõhvi Parish, Ida-Viru County, in northeastern Estonia. As of 2011 Census, the settlement's population was 291.

Tammiku was first mentioned in 1241 in the Danish Census Book. It is the birthplace of Estonian amateur featherweight boxer Evald Seepere (1911-1990)

References

Boroughs and small boroughs in Estonia